Capitol Hill Music is a Canadian independent record label, specializing in hip-hop and R&B music.

The Toronto-based label was founded in the mid 1990s by rapper Saukrates, and his manager Chase Parsons. In 1997, the label released Kardinal Offishall's debut album, Eye & I. Two years later, the label released Saukrates' debut album, The Underground Tapes. In the 2000s, Saukrates produced records for his group Big Black Lincoln, and R&B singer Andreena Mill.

See also
 List of record labels

References

External links
 Capitol Hill Music at Discogs

Canadian hip hop record labels
Canadian independent record labels
Contemporary R&B record labels